Kevin Paul Lepage (born June 26, 1962) is a retired American professional stock car racing driver, who last drove in NASCAR in 2014.

Racing career

Early career
Lepage spent the 1980s driving in both the Busch North series and the Vermont-based American Canadian Tour series. He drove with occasional success in these series for the better part of 14 years. The highlight during this time was 3 victories at Vermont's Thunder Road International SpeedBowl in its famous "Milk Bowl" race in 1985, 1989 and 1993.

Early Busch Series career
Lepage made his Busch Series debut in 1986 at Oxford Plains Speedway, starting 41st and finishing 15th in the No. 09 Buick owned by Carl Merrill. He became a Busch Series regular in 1994, serving as an owner/driver in the No. 71 Vermont Teddy Bear Company car and running for Rookie of the Year honors. He had a best finish of 9th at New Hampshire International Speedway, in which he got a flat tire at the very end of the race, and finished 24th in points. The 1995 season resulted in five Top 10s and finishing 18th in points. At the end of the season, he lost his sponsorship and ran his own car in 1996 unsponsored until April. Lepage then joined David Ridling and his No. 88 Ridling Motorsports team with sponsorship from Ridling's own Farmer's Choice Fertilizer. He won his first career race at the season finale Jiffy Lube Miami 300 with Hype Energy sponsorship. He finished eighth in points with 1 win, three Top 5s and 10 Top 10s. He ran most of the 1997 season driving for Ridling before leaving due to the team losing its sponsor. Lepage would finish out the year running for Phoenix Racing and ST Motorsports. He finished 12th in points, posting three Top 5s and six Top 10s. Lepage had his Cup debut by qualifying for the Fall Charlotte race in the No. 91 LJ Racing car in an impressive 12th. He would also run the Fall Talladega and Atlanta races with finishes of 17th at Talladega and 29th at Atlanta.

Winston Cup 1998–2002
Lepage made the move to Winston Cup in 1998, driving for the LJ Racing team. Despite the team's lack of sponsorship, Lepage posted two fourteenth-place finishes, catching the eye of Jack Roush, owner of Roush Racing. Lepage announced his decision to depart LJ Racing in late June 1998 and sat out 6 races to work out the details of the new contract with Roush. He would drive the No. 16 Primestar-sponsored Ford Taurus in place of Ted Musgrave, who was released after Lepage's hiring. He earned a pair of top-10 finishes in 13 races for Roush, his best finish being a sixth place at Charlotte. Despite missing several races, he nearly won the 1998 Rookie of the Year title. Lepage also drove in the Busch Series for Doug Taylor's No. 40 team with sponsorship from Channellock. Lepage finished 14th in points despite only starting 24 races out of 31. Lepage won his second career race at the August Food City 250 at Bristol and won his first career pole at the June MBNA Platinum 200 at Dover. He finished the year with one win, six Top 5s and 10 Top 10s.

Lepage returned in 1999 with sponsorship from Primestar which switched to TV Guide in April after Primestar was sold to the General Motors-owned DirectTV. He had one top 5, two top-tens and won the pole at the season-ending NAPA 500, earning him a 25th-place points finish. The highlight of the season was a 5th-place finish in the Southern 500 which qualified him for the Winston No Bull 5 at Talladega.  Lepage also ran in the Busch Series driving the No. 99 J&J Racing/Brewco Motorsports car with a  sponsorship from Red Man. He finished 35th in points with 14 starts, two Top 5s and six Top 10s.

He began 2000 unsponsored, before picking up backing from FamilyClick.com. He failed to qualify twice and finished 28th in points with one Top 5 and three Top 10s with a best finish of 5th at Texas. At the end of the year, FamilyClick ended its backing and Roush closed the 16 team. That season Lepage restarted his No. 71 Busch team as Matrix Motorsports in a partnership with Brewco Motorsports with sponsorship from Red Man, Southern Pride Chewing Tobacco and State Fair Corn Dogs. He finished 42nd in points with 10 starts, one Top 5 and two Top 10s with a best finish of 3rd at Atlanta.

In 2001 Lepage returned to the Busch Series to run his own team, Matrix Motorsports, driving the No. 71 State Fair Corn Dogs/Ball Park Franks Ford. Running 15 races, he had one top-five (3rd at Fontana), four top-tens and a pole at Kansas Speedway. In addition to those races he drove for Phoenix Racing at Loudon (Finished 35th).  His team also won the pole (Finished 8th) at Watkins Glen with Scott Pruett.  He also returned to the Cup series, running the No. 4 Kodak Chevrolet for Morgan-McClure Motorsports, replacing Robby Gordon after five races. Lepage had a best finish of 11th (Texas) in 21 races with them. Late in the season, he switched to the No. 7 Nations Rent Ultra Motorsports Ford, posting a 10th-place finish at Talladega Superspeedway. Despite missing seven races, Lepage ended up 36th in points.

2002–2007 
Early in 2002, Lepage's team went inactive due to a lack of sponsorship, even though he had an 8th at Daytona and a 4th at Las Vegas. He soon joined Brewco Motorsports, driving their No. 37 Timber Wolf Chevy. In 24 starts that year, he had six top-tens and two poles, finishing 25th in points. He also ran three Cup races, two in the No. 38 Quest Motor Racing Ford, and another for BAM Racing at Talladega in a car sponsored by Billy Ray Cyrus's show Doc. His best finish that year was a 40th at Loudon.

In 2003, Lepage ran his own team at the Cup level for one race, finishing 32nd at the Coca-Cola 600 along with the Winston Open. He ran two races that year for CLR Racing, where he had a fourth place start at Michigan, before returning to Morgan-McClure to finish the year, his best finish a fourteenth at Atlanta. He teamed with Morgan-McClure again in 2004, but after six races, Lepage departed due to a lack of sponsorship. He then signed with Competitive Edge Motorsports, posting a best finish of 41st twice, before leaving the team. He ended the season with R&J Racing, where he had a best finish of 27th at Phoenix International Raceway. He also ran eleven races in the Busch Series for MacDonald Motorsports, where he had two top-fifteen finishes.

In 2005, Lepage returned to R&J, and started the season off with a third-place finish in the Gatorade Duels and a ninth-place finish at the Daytona 500. Unfortunately, the closest Lepage came to another top 10 was a 12th-place finish at Lowe's Motor Speedway in the Coca-Cola 600, and was released from the ride after the Brickyard 400. He signed with Peak Performance Racing for the balance of the year, and had a sixth-place qualifying effort at Kansas. He finished the season 39th in points.  He also ran six races with MacDonald in the Busch Series as well, posting a ninth-place finish at Lowe's.  That year, Lepage made his debut in the Craftsman Truck Series for Green Light Racing at Dover finishing 19th.

Lepage returned to Peak for 2006, but due to a lack of funding, the team was sold to Front Row Motorsports in April. Lepage ran a couple of races for FRM before leaving for BAM Racing. He ran 12 races for BAM with a best finish of 21st at Bristol Motor Speedway before leaving them. Lepage then rejoined Front Row Motorsports making two of the final eight races in their No. 34 and No. 61 cars. He ended up 40th in points even with missing 14 races.  He also ran a limited schedule in the Busch Series for Mac Hill Motorsports with a best finish of 19th in seven races. Lepage ran two races for Green Light Racing in the Craftsman Truck Series with a best finish of 21st at Michigan.  At the end of the year, Lepage sold the remnants of Matrix Motorsports to start a lawn care business called Matrix Lawn and Landscaping.

In 2007, Lepage started the year driving the No. 34 Front Row Motorsports car in the races where the team could afford to run two cars. Starting in late April, Front Row would mainly run the No. 37 car with Lepage making most of the attempts. In 27 attempts, Lepage was only able to make two races; at Darlington and New Hampshire Motor Speedway.  He also drove a part-time schedule for a few teams in the Busch Series including the No. 52 Means Racing Ford, as well as some additional races for Randy MacDonald and D.D.L. Motorsports with a best finish of 28th at Watkins Glen. Lepage also had two starts for Team Racing in the Craftsman Truck Series with a best finish of 35th at Texas.

2008–2017

Lepage returned to driving full-time in the Nationwide Series (formerly known as the Busch Series) in 2008, driving for Specialty Racing. While racing for Specialty, Lepage made one of the most controversial moves in the history of NASCAR at Talladega when he proceeded to pull off pit road and directly in front of the entire field which was bearing down on him at almost  triggering a 15 car accident. Lepage blamed it on the spotter for every other team stating "nobody recognized my car was damaged and vastly underpowered," but later apologized for the accident himself. Lepage was released by Specialty after the July Daytona race and was replaced by Brandon Whitt.  The following race at Chicagoland, he failed to qualify a car brought by Front Row Motorsports.  After he failed to qualify, Lepage drove the No. 52 Means Racing entry for Brad Teague in order to maintain his position in the driver's points. He then attempted to race at Gateway in Mike Harmon's No. 84 Chevrolet, but failed to qualify.  Later in the season, he was hired to drive the No. 73 for Derrike Cope, and finished the season 28th in driver's points, despite missing 8 races.  Lepage ran one Truck Series race at Homestead for Green Light Racing finishing 35th.

He began the 2009 season without a full-time ride, but after running Derrike Cope's No. 73 at Bristol, Lepage joined Jimmy Means' team at Texas in April until leaving after the June race at New Hampshire.  He then joined Derrike Cope's team for the rest of the season at Chicago primarily driving the No. 78, but also occasionally driving the No. 73. Lepage also ran one race for Green Light Racing at Dover in the Camping World Truck Series finishing 33rd, his most recent start in that series to date.

Lepage announced on February 5, 2010, that he would be returning to Mac Hill Motorsports for the 2010 season with sponsorship from Revolucion World Wide/Start Energy Drink.  Unfortunately the sponsorship deal fell through after four races and the team was forced to "start and park" races in order to keep costs down.  Even with this measure, finances forced the team to start skipping races by mid year.  The team partnered up with RaceDaySponsor.com in order to give local sponsors an opportunity to be a sponsor each week.  This earned the team finances to get to the track, but not enough to run full races.  When the Mac Hill team was unable to get to the track, Lepage got to run some races for No. 52 Jimmy Means Racing Chevrolet (made four out of five attempts) and No. 04 Davis Motorsports Chevrolet at Road America.  Even with the limited finances, Lepage was able to make 25 out of 31 race attempts and ended up 40th in points.

In 2010, Lepage was in a Sprint Cup car for the first time since 2007.  Lepage joined back up with Morgan-McClure Motorsports to run the Irwin Tools Night Race at Bristol with sponsorship from Alpha Natural Resources/Joy Mining Machinery.  Lepage was unable to qualify for the race.

On November 20, 2010, Mac Hill Motorsports announced that it was discontinuing its Nationwide Series team, allowing Lepage to seek another ride.

On January 10, 2011, Lepage announced that he would drive for Team Rensi Motorsports No. 24 team in the Nationwide Series, bringing sponsorship from RaceDaySponsor.com, marking the first time since 2008 that Lepage would run a full race distance. Not enough sponsorship was found and the team was forced to start and park four of the five races they ran. After the spring Texas race, they closed down. On April 26, Lepage announced that he would be joining Means Racing starting at Richmond and would work with the team to procure more sponsorship for the rest of the season. Sponsorship was found to allow Lepage to run 17 races without having to start and park, with a best finish of 20th at Phoenix.  Lepage finished 27th in Points, which was his best finish since 2008.

In February 2012, Lepage announced that Race Day Sponsor.com and himself were no longer working together. Lepage wasn't able to start his season until securing a ride in the No. 28 Robinson-Blakeney Racing for the 4th and 5th races of the season at Bristol and California with a best finish of 31st at Bristol.  That team shut down but Lepage was able to start and park the next weeks race at Texas with Mike Harmon Racing's No. 74.  The next three weeks Lepage drove the No. 52 Means Racing car at Richmond, Talladega and Darlington with a best finish of 27th at Richmond.  Lepage then substituted in Tri-Star Motorsports start and park No. 10 for the next 4 races highlighted by qualifying efforts of 25th at Dover and Michigan.  After the sub job ended, Lepage start and parked for Means Racing at Kentucky.  Lepage then joined the Deware Racing Group in their No. 86.  In preparation for the 2013 season, the team ran a limited schedule of 9 of the final 17 races.  Due to a lack of sponsorship the team start and parked 7 of the nine races, though with sponsorship from Qello at Bristol and Kengor Metals at Charlotte the team had finishes of 20th and 26th respectively.  Lepage ended up 35th in points with only running 20 of 33 races.

The 2013 season started with the Deware Racing Group unable to secure sponsorship, which left them mostly inactive and Lepage starting the season without a ride.  It took to the third race of season at Las Vegas for Lepage to get a ride with No. 74 Mike Harmon Racing for that race and weeks later at Texas with a best finish of 28th at Texas.  Three weeks later, Lepage start and parked for Means Racing at Darlington.  In June at Iowa, Lepage drove the No. 87 NEMCO Motorsports car in practice in preparation for owner/driver Joe Nemechek to arrive from Pocono Raceway to run the race.  Due to the Iowa race being delayed a day cause of rain, Lepage got to drive the 87 to a 19th-place finish while Nemechek drove at Pocono.  Lepage would finish the season start and parking the No. 74 in four races, failing to qualify the No. 86 at Bristol and running JD Motorsports's No. 4 car in races at Mid-Ohio and Kentucky with finishes of 20th and 19th respectively.  Lepage ended up 39th in points with only running 10 of 33 races.

Lepage started the 2014 season without a ride.  Starting with the third race of the season at Las Vegas, Lepage drove the No. 74 Mike Harmon Racing Dodge.  He drove for them through the fifth race of the season at California with a best finish of 30th at California.  Lepage joined JD Motorsports in their No. 87 for the next three races.  His best finish was a 19th at Darlington, but the ride ended when the 87 team's only car was wrecked at Richmond.  Lepage drove the 74 at Charlotte but finished 39th due to a rear gear failure.  Lepage later drove start and park efforts for Tri-Star Motorsports at Michigan and JGL Racing at Elkhart Lake.  Starting at Kentucky in June, Lepage drove the Mike Harmon Racing No. 74 at six race weekends until Richmond in September with a best finish of 33rd at New Hampshire to go with 2 DNQ's.  Lepage would make his last career start with TriStar Motorsports at Dover finishing 31st.  Lepage did attempt to qualify at Homestead with Mike Harmon Racing but failed to qualify.

Lepage was unable to find sponsorship to compete in NASCAR after the 2014 season and instead focused on his business interests.  On March 21, 2017, Lepage announced he would run in the 55th Milk Bowl on October 1, 2017, at Thunder Road International SpeedBowl with Boyce Racing in what is hinted at as his final race.  On August 23, 2017, Lepage announced State Water Heaters, Citgo, Vermont Teddy Bear Company, Allen Lumber and Shearer Chevrolet as the sponsors for his final race.  Unfortunately for Lepage, he had to run the Last Chance qualifying race due to a slow qualifying speed.  Due to a spin during that race, Lepage came up two positions short of being able to compete in the 55th Milk Bowl.

Personal life
Lepage was born in Shelburne in Vermont on June 26, 1962. He was the only stock car driver from Vermont competing in the NASCAR Winston Cup Series in the 1990s. Lepage is a practicing Catholic.

Motorsports career results

NASCAR
(key) (Bold – Pole position awarded by qualifying time. Italics – Pole position earned by points standings or practice time. * – Most laps led.)

Sprint Cup Series

Daytona 500

Nationwide Series

Camping World Truck Series

 Season still in progress
 Ineligible for series points

ARCA Permatex SuperCar Series
(key) (Bold – Pole position awarded by qualifying time. Italics – Pole position earned by points standings or practice time. * – Most laps led.)

References

External links
 
 
 

Living people
1962 births
People from Shelburne, Vermont
Racing drivers from Vermont
NASCAR drivers
NASCAR team owners
ARCA Menards Series drivers
CARS Tour drivers
American Speed Association drivers
RFK Racing drivers